The Erg Chech, is a large erg in southwestern Algeria and northern Mali.

Geography
It is an almost uninhabited part of the greater Sahara Desert, an inhospitable desert region with long, extremely hot summers and short, very warm winters. The Erg Chech is a vast sandy expanse including compound and complex linear and star dunes. The mean elevation of the Erg Chech is just above 300 m, slightly lower than the neighboring Erg Iguidi stretching to the north. The barren plain of the Tanezrouft is located to the southeast. 
  
One of the localities of the commune of Akabli in Aoulef District, Adrar Province, Algeria, is named 'Erg Chech'.

Meteorites

About  of meteorites were collected in the Chergach strewn field, located in the Erg Chech north of Taoudenni, during the fall and winter 2007. Desert nomads reported that during daytime in July 2007 several detonations were heard over a wide area, a smoke cloud was seen and several stones fell from the sky, however no fireball was reported. Ouled Bleila was the finder of the first meteorites, but he died in October 2007 in a car accident on his way back from the trip to the Chergach strewn field.

See also
Geography of Algeria
List of ergs

References

Ergs of Africa
Deserts of Algeria
Landforms of Mali
Natural regions of Africa